Hafnium tetrabromide is the inorganic compound with the formula HfBr4.  It is the most common bromide of hafnium.  It is a colorless, diamagnetic moisture sensitive solid that sublimes in vacuum. It adopts a structure very similar to that of zirconium tetrabromide, featuring tetrahedral Hf centers, in contrast to the polymeric nature of hafnium tetrachloride.

References

Bromides
Hafnium compounds
Metal halides